Seymour "Blue Jaw" Magoon (born April 21, 1908, year of death unknown) was an American hitman in New York's Murder, Inc. gang, one of many members who were implicated by the testimony of former member and government informant Abe "Kid Twist" Reles.

A longtime member of Murder, Inc., Magoon was heavily involved in the painters' unions with Martin "Buggsy" Goldstein during the 1920s and 1930s. Magoon helped testify against the other members of Murder, Inc., along with Albert "Tick Tock" Tannenbaum and Sholem Bernstein.

Cultural reference
 The U.S. TV series Las Vegas season 3 episode 4 had a reference to his possible death.

References

External links

Kill The Dutchman! - The Story of Dutch Schultz - Chapter XX by Paul Sann

Year of birth unknown
Jewish American gangsters
Murder, Inc.
Year of death missing
1908 births